Nai Thet Lwin (also Htet Lwin; born 1940) is an ethnic Mon Myanmar politician who was the Minister of Ethnic Affairs in the government of President Htin Kyaw.

Background 
Thet Lwin was born to Aung Nyein and Khin Thein in Kawkareik Township, Kayin State, on 20 October 1940. He went to Moulmein College (now Mawlamyine University) and studied philosophy. He started in politics at the age of 18, joining the Mon Development Party. After graduating in 1970, he focused on teaching and preserving Mon literature and culture.

Political career 

In 1988, he brought Mon politicians together in his house to form the Mon National Democratic Front, as part of the "8888" pro-democracy movement. He became vice-chairman of the MNDF, running for a seat in the Mon State capital, Mawlamyine, in the 1990 election.

After the 1990 election, the party was banned and he went into business, including rubber, fisheries processing, food exports and hotels. In 2011 he participated in government peace talks with the Mon National Liberation Army.

He helped reestablish the party in 2012, after political parties were allowed again. In 2015 he participated in the founding of the United Nationalities Alliance, which brought together eight ethnic minority political parties in Myanmar. He called for the implementation of a federal system in Myanmar as a top priority and said a democratic system and the rule of law were "of great importance". He was appointed the Minister of Ethnic Affairs, a newly formed ministry, in 2015. Asked what his policies were, he said, simply, "I will follow [NLD Chairperson] Daw Aung San Suu's instructions ... the country's ethnic minorities all love and trust her."

He took office on 30 March 2015 as part of the first government of the country formed by the opposition National League for Democracy (NLD) following their victory in the 2015 general election.  The vice-chair of the Mon National Party, he was one of only three ministers appointed to cabinet from a party other than the ruling NLD.

Family 
He is married to Kyin Than and has four children, Mahn Banya San, Mi Kon Chan, Mahn Lagun Ein, and Man Banya Aung Htun. His daughter, Mi Kon Chan, was elected an MP for the NLD for Paung Township in the 2015 election.

References 

Government ministers of Myanmar
Living people
1940 births
Mon National Party politicians
Burmese people of Mon descent